An anticanon is a legal text that is now viewed as wrongly reasoned or decided. The term "anticanon" stands in distinction to the canon, which contains basic principles or rulings that almost all people support.

In the United States
The anticanon in U.S. constitutional law is a small set of U.S. Supreme Court judgements that have subsequently become widely considered to have been grievously mistaken for their poor legal reasoning and negative consequences. Anticanon judgments usually uphold government policies that promote discrimination and oppression. Many have never been formally overturned, though the Supreme Court has usually limited their later effects, rhetorically repudiated them, and refused to cite them in subsequent cases.

These cases are:

Dred Scott v. Sandford (1857): held that the U.S. Constitution did not extend American citizenship to people of black African descent, and thus they could not enjoy the rights and privileges the Constitution conferred upon American citizens. Overturned by the Thirteenth Amendment, which abolished slavery, and the Fourteenth Amendment, which guarantees citizenship to "[a]ll persons born or naturalized in the United States and subject to the jurisdiction thereof."

Plessy v. Ferguson (1896): established the doctrine of separate but equal by holding that racial segregation does not violate the Fourteenth Amendment as long as facilities are equal in quality. Overturned (de facto) by Brown v. Board of Education, which held that racial segregation in public schools is unconstitutional. 

Lochner v. New York (1905): held that a New York statute prescribing maximum working hours for bakers violated the bakers' right to freedom of contract under the Fourteenth Amendment. Lochner is part of the Lochner era in constitutional law, wherein the Supreme Court struck down many state economic regulations under the doctrine of substantive due process. The Lochner era ended in the late 1930s, usually attributed to progressive reformer Franklin D. Roosevelt's court-packing threat, with the switch in time that saved nine in West Coast Hotel Co. v. Parrish (1937) (upholding a minimum wage law enacted by Washington state).

Insular Cases (1901): held that constitutional rights do not automatically extend to all places under American control, including those living in unincorporated territories such as Puerto Rico. The Insular Cases were never overturned, but Justice Neil Gorsuch criticized them in a concurrence to United States v. Vaello Madero, 596 U.S. ___ (2022) (holding that United States citizens living in Puerto Rico could be excluded from the Supplemental Security Income program). He said the Insular Cases are "shameful," "have no foundation in the Constitution and rest instead on racial stereotypes," and "deserve no place in our law."

Buck v. Bell (1921): held that a state statute permitting compulsory sterilization of the "unfit," including intellectually disabled, did not violate the Due Process Clause of the Fourteenth Amendment. The holding was weakened by Skinner v. Oklahoma (1942), which prohibited compulsory sterilization of male habitual criminals. Federal statutes, including the Rehabilitation Act of 1973 and the Americans with Disabilities Act of 1990, also provide protections for people with disabilities, defined as both physical and mental impairments.

Korematsu v. United States (1944): upheld the exclusion of Japanese Americans from the West Coast Military Area during World War II, permitting the removal of West Coast Japanese Americans to exclusion camps. Decided on the same day as Ex parte Endo, which held that loyal citizens could not be detained without a hearing. Ex parte Endo effectively ended Japanese American exclusion and internment. Chief Justice John Roberts explicitly repudiated the Korematsu decision in his majority opinion in the 2018 case of Trump v. Hawaii (vacating the injunction against Executive Order 13780, also known as also known Travel Ban 2.0, and thereby allowing it to take effect). The statement has no precedential effect, and so does not legally "overrule" Korematsu, because it was dicta.

Other cases that have been denounced to significant but lesser extents include:

Chisholm v. Georgia (1793)
Johnson v. M'Intosh (1823)
Prigg v. Pennsylvania (1842)
Bradwell v. Illinois (1873)
Civil Rights Cases (1875)
Minor v. Happersett (1875)
United States v. Cruikshank (1876)
Chae Chan Ping v. United States (1889)
Pollock v. Farmers' Loan & Trust Co. (1895)
Giles v. Harris (1903)
Lone Wolf v. Hitchcock (1903)
Muller v. Oregon (1908)
Hammer v. Dagenhart (1918)
Schenck v. United States (1919)
Ozawa v. United States (1922)
Adkins v. Children's Hospital (1923)
United States v. Bhagat Singh Thind (1923)
Lum v. Rice (1927)
Buck v. Bell (1927)
NLRB v. Mackay Radio & Telegraph Co. (1938)
Minersville School District v. Gobitis (1940)
Wickard v. Filburn (1942)
Goesaert v. Cleary (1948)
Dennis v. United States (1951)
Hoyt v. Florida (1961)
Pierson v. Ray (1967)
Buckley v. Valeo (1971)
Apodaca v. Oregon (1972)
Roe v. Wade (1973)
Milliken v. Bradley (1974)
Stump v. Sparkman(1978)
Bowers v. Hardwick (1986)
McCleskey v. Kemp (1987)
City of Boerne v. Flores (1997)
Bush v. Gore (2000)
Kelo v. City of New London (2005)
Citizens United v. Federal Election Commission (2010)
Shelby County v. Holder (2013)
Burwell v. Hobby Lobby Stores, Inc. (2014)
Rucho v. Common Cause (2019)
Espinoza v. Montana Department of Revenue (2020)
Whole Woman's Health v. Jackson (2021)
 Kennedy v. Bremerton School District (2022)
 New York State Rifle & Pistol Association, Inc. v. Bruen (2022)
 Dobbs v. Jackson Women's Health Organization (2022)

References

American legal terminology
Supreme Court of the United States
Judicial legal terminology
Legal interpretation